Field hockey at the 1995 Pan American Games in Mar del Plata took place from 12 to 25 March 1995. It served as a qualification tournament for the 1996 Summer Olympics in Atlanta, Georgia. The number one earned a ticket for the Olympic tournament. The men competed for the eighth time at the Pan Americans, the women for the third time.

Medal summary

Medalists

Medal table

Men's tournament

The competition consisted of two stages; a preliminary round followed by a classification round.

Participating nations

Preliminary round

Classification matches

Bronze-medal match

Gold-medal match

Final standings

 Qualified for the 1996 Summer Olympics

Women's tournament

The competition consisted of two stages; a preliminary round followed by a classification round.

Participating nations

Preliminary round

Classification matches

Bronze-medal match

Gold-medal match

Final standings

References
US Field Hockey
Pan Am Hockey
Argentina Olympic Committee

 
Events at the 1995 Pan American Games
Pan American Games
1995
1995
1995